Veronica Kvassetskaia-Tsyglan (Kva-set–sky-ya – t-see-g-lan) (born December 28, 1966) is a Canadian classical realist painter specializing in the Old Masters’ technique. She is active in the contemporary revival of the classical tradition of fine art portraiture in Canada.
She founded the Portrait Society of Canada in 2001 in Toronto, Canada and is the current chairman.
In 2016 Veronica Kvassetskaia Tsyglan discovered “The Catalyst of Vitality”.

Life 

Kvassetskaia was born on December 28, 1966, in Moscow to Russian mother Taisia Levicheva and Polish father Vladimir Kvassetski. She has an older sister named Olga. 
Kvassetskaia-Tsyglan began displaying talent and an affection for the arts at an early age—playing the violin, singing, sculpting and drawing. Later on, she developed an interest in analytical chemistry, science and psychology. 
From a young age, Kvassetskaia knew that she wanted to be an artist and as a teenager she began reproducing works of the Old Masters. She became a pupil of the Soviet Ossetian artist Lolita Gally. She studied Fine Art at the V. Surikov State Academy Art Institute, then Art History at the Moscow State University.
She emigrated from Russia in 1991.  
Kvassetskaia-Tsyglan perfected her skills in Frankfurt, Germany while working in the field of restoration. She reproduced Old Masters’ works in Alte Pinakothek, the Louvre, and then in Larnaca, Cyprus where she studied Greek Orthodox iconography at the Agia Moni Monastery workshop. In 1996, she moved to Toronto, Canada, where she currently lives and paints at her studio in Willowdale. She has a son, Vladimir Tsyglian, who is a professional actor and opera singer, a daughter Anna who is a aerial circus performer, and youngest child Bee.

Work 

Kvassetskaia-Tsyglan is a realist painter specializing in classical portraiture. She follows in the style of the Old Masters, such as Michelangelo and Leonardo da Vinci, producing portraits that appear to be a step back in time. Kvassetskaia-Tsyglan's work is known for its realism, museum quality and archival permanence.
Throughout her professional career, Veronica has many years to the research and study of her craft, its history and techniques. Her central focus has been uncovering, understanding and reproducing the secrets of the Old Masters.

Her portraits have been exhibited in museums and prestigious private and corporate collections internationally. Her works can be found in the collections of former Canadian Finance Minister Jim Flaherty and the 28th Lieutenant Governor of Ontario, The Hon. David Onley, the Countess Von Wedel, Sonja Bata Museum and St. Marks Coptic Museum.
She has received portrait commissions from Vladislav Tretiak,  Measha Brueggergosman, Ekaterina Gubanova, Dmitri Hvorostovsky, Lee Carroll, Larysa Kuzmenko, Tom Diamond, Simon Whitfield, Jessica Zelinka, Claire Hopkinson, Brahm Goldhamer, Patricia Bezzoubenko, Murray Pollitt and a historical portrait of Grand Duchess Anastasia Nikolaevna of Russia.

Catalyst of Vitality

In 2016 she discovered a unique method of creating an enhanced personal vibrational connection between the model and the portrait.  This method is  known as “the Catalyst of Vitality”, a truly unique technique of artistic immortality which involves using a physical DNA sample( hair, nail powder, ash, etc.,) in the oil mixture during the application of the oil onto the canvas. This revolutionary painting technique is a  method of preserving  the identity of the individual on a genetic level for future generations to come. She is the first documented artist known for applying this technique.

Awards and recognition

2002 First Place Award, International Portrait Competition, Jackman Hall, AGO, PSC
2002 Peoples’ Choice Award, International Portrait Competition, Jackman Hall, AGO, PSC
2003 Elizabeth Greenshield Foundation Award Grant, Canada
2004 Certificate of Excellence in Fine Art Portraiture, PSC, Canada
2007 Honorary certificate and induction into the World Edition of “Who’s Who”
2013 International Contemporary Artist catalogue, Volume XVIII, USA 
2014 International Contemporary Artist, Volume X, USA,
2005–Present, International Juror for "The Miracle Of the Portrait: Canadian Portrait Competition"
2002–Present, Professional Member of the Arts and Letters Club of Toronto

Appearances in Media 

2009 Featured On Bravo (Canada) in “Star Portraits, episode 3, Measha Brueggergossman”(TV Series). PTV Productions. Canada
2014 “Creating life on Canvas” - Biographical Documentary by M. Petrenko Productions

Gallery Exhibitions 

Gallery 7, Yorkville, Toronto
Grimsby Public Art Gallery, Grimsby, ON
Art Student league, New York, NY
Frederick Horsman Varley Art Gallery, Unionville, ON
Imaginart Gallery, Toronto, ON
Heliconian Club, Toronto, ON
Toronto Centre for the Arts Gallery, Toronto, ON
John B. Aird Gallery, Toronto, ON
St Marks Coptic Museum, Iconography Exhibition, Toronto, ON
Bohemiarte Gallery, Montreal, QC
The Arts and Letters Club of Toronto, ON

Quotes 

"…I love Fine Art more than any Joy and pleasure in my life. No matter where I am, what I do, what thought I entertain, Fine art is always in my mind, in my heart and within my most sincere desires." - Veronica Kvassetskaia-Tsyglan

External links 

http://www.portraitsociety.ca/
http://www.portraitcanada.com/

References 

1966 births
Living people
Artists from Moscow
Canadian women artists
Russian emigrants to Canada